Alfredo Pasotti (6 January 1925 – 12 September 2000) was an Italian professional road bicycle racer. He won stages 3 and 9 at the 1950 Tour de France and stage 13 at the 1952 Giro d'Italia.

References

External links 

Official Tour de France results for Alfredo Pasotti

Italian male cyclists
1925 births
2000 deaths
Italian Tour de France stage winners
Italian Giro d'Italia stage winners
Cyclists from the Province of Pavia
Tour de Suisse stage winners